Troy Niklas (born September 18, 1992) is a former American football tight end. He was drafted by the Arizona Cardinals in the second round of the 2014 NFL Draft. He played college football at Notre Dame.

High school
Niklas attended Servite High School in Anaheim, California. He was a two-way standout as both an offensive and defensive lineman. He helped lead Servite to 14–1 record in 2010, a second straight CIF Southern Section Pac-5 Division title and runner-up in state playoffs. He was named the Los Angeles Times lineman of the year as a senior in 2010.

Also a standout athlete, Niklas was one of the state's top performers in the discus throw (top throw of 54.10 meters as a senior).

Considered a four-star recruit by Rivals.com, he was rated the 24th-best offensive tackle prospect in the nation. He accepted a scholarship from Notre Dame over offers from Stanford and USC.

College career
Niklas attended the University of Notre Dame from 2011 to 2013. As a freshman, he played as a linebacker, appearing in 12 games with one start against Michigan State. He was moved to tight end as a sophomore. Playing behind Tyler Eifert, he caught 5 passes for 75 yards and one touchdown. As a junior, he hauled in 32 receptions for 498 yards with five touchdowns.

On January 9, 2014, Niklas announced his intentions to forgo his remaining eligibility and enter the 2014 NFL Draft.

Professional career

Arizona Cardinals
Niklas was drafted by the Arizona Cardinals in the second round (52nd overall) of the 2014 NFL Draft. He was the fourth tight end selected in 2014.

Niklas progress as a rookie was slowed due to his inability to participate in organized team activities after recovering from a hernia surgery in February.

On September 27, 2016, Niklas was placed on injured reserve.

In 2017, Niklas played in 15 games with 11 starts, recording 11 catches for 132 yards and one touchdown.

New England Patriots
On April 4, 2018, Niklas signed with the New England Patriots. On July 27, Niklas was released by the team.

Tampa Bay Buccaneers
On July 24, 2019, Niklas signed with the Tampa Bay Buccaneers. On July 29, 2019, Niklas was waived/injured by the Buccaneers and placed on injured reserve. He was released on August 6.

Personal life
Niklas' uncle, Bruce Matthews, played at USC, was ninth overall pick in 1983 NFL Draft, earned Pro Bowl honors 14 times while playing with NFL Houston Oilers/Tennessee Titans from 1983–2001 and was elected to the Pro Football Hall of Fame in 2007.

References

External links
Notre Dame Fighting Irish bio

1992 births
Living people
Sportspeople from Fullerton, California
Players of American football from California
American football tight ends
American football linebackers
Notre Dame Fighting Irish football players
Arizona Cardinals players
New England Patriots players
Tampa Bay Buccaneers players
Matthews football family